The 2010 Humboldt State Lumberjacks football team represented Humboldt State University during the 2010 NCAA Division II football season. Humboldt State competed in the Great Northwest Athletic Conference (GNAC).

The 2010 Lumberjacks were led by third-year head coach Rob Smith. They played home games at the Redwood Bowl in Arcata, California. Humboldt State finished the season with a record of eight wins and three losses (8–3, 6–2 GNAC). Each team played the other conference teams twice during the season (home and away). The Lumberjacks averaged over 30 points per game, outscoring their opponents 357–202 for the 2010 season.

Schedule

Team players in the NFL
No Humboldt State players were selected in the 2011 NFL Draft.

The following finished their college career in 2010, were not drafted, but played in the NFL.

Notes

References

Humboldt State
Humboldt State Lumberjacks football seasons
Humboldt State Lumberjacks football